Ashleigh Joëlle Elisabeth Weerden (born 7 June 1999) is a Dutch professional footballer who plays as a forward for Dutch Eredivisie club Ajax and the Netherlands national team.

International career
Weerden made her senior team debut for Netherlands on 4 March 2019 in a 1–0 defeat against Poland.

Career statistics

International

References

External links

 
Senior national team profile at Onsoranje.nl (in Dutch)
Under-23 national team profile at Onsoranje.nl (in Dutch)
Under-20 national team profile at Onsoranje.nl (in Dutch)
Under-19 national team profile at Onsoranje.nl (in Dutch)
Under-17 national team profile at Onsoranje.nl (in Dutch)
Under-16 national team profile at Onsoranje.nl (in Dutch)

1999 births
Living people
Footballers from Amsterdam
Dutch women's footballers
Women's association football forwards
FC Twente (women) players
Montpellier HSC (women) players
Eredivisie (women) players
Division 1 Féminine players
Netherlands women's international footballers
Dutch expatriate women's footballers
Dutch expatriate sportspeople in France
Expatriate women's footballers in France